Beshik Tappeh (also Romanized as Beshīk Tappeh; also known as Besh Tappeh, Besh Tepe, Peshik Tapeh, Peshīk Tappeh, and Pishik Tapeh) is a village in Shirin Su Rural District, Shirin Su District, Kabudarahang County, Hamadan Province, Iran. At the 2006 census, its population was 950, in 185 families.

References 

Populated places in Kabudarahang County